Conrad Lafcadio Hall,  (June 21, 1926 – January 4, 2003) was a French Polynesian-born American cinematographer. Named after writers Joseph Conrad and Lafcadio Hearn, he was best known for photographing such films as In Cold Blood, Cool Hand Luke, Butch Cassidy and the Sundance Kid, American Beauty, and Road to Perdition. For his work he garnered a number of awards, including three Academy Awards and three BAFTA Awards.

In 2003, Hall was judged to be one of history's ten most influential cinematographers in a survey of the members of the International Cinematographers Guild. He has been given a star on the Hollywood Walk of Fame.

Early life

Conrad L Hall was born on June 21, 1926 in Papeete, Tahiti, French Polynesia. His father was James Norman Hall, an ace pilot and captain in the Lafayette Escadrille that fought for France in World War I. James also co-wrote the 1932 novel Mutiny on the Bounty. His mother was Sarah ("Lala") Winchester Hall, who was half Polynesian. Growing up during the relative infancy of cinema, Hall never was around cameras, and the idea of going to the movies was a foreign concept. In his early-mid teens, Hall attended Cate School, a boarding preparatory school near Santa Barbara, California.

After graduating, Hall was told by his father to find his path in life. Hall attended the University of Southern California, intending to study journalism, but ended up doing poorly and instead went to USC's School of Cinema-Television (now the USC School of Cinematic Arts). He wasn't sure this was the right decision, but that since this was a new art form it would be interesting to start from the bottom. Hall attended the School of Cinema at a time when Slavko Vorkapić was the head of the program; Hall later recalled that “He taught me that film-making was a new visual language. He taught the principles, and left the rest up to us”. After creating his first shots in school he fell in love with the art and wanted to continue telling his stories through imagery. A few people that visited the school during his education included John Huston and Orson Welles. After graduation in 1949, Hall expected to get a job right out of college. At the time, however, Hollywood only allowed the camera crew to be filled with people that were on the International Photographers Guild roster.

Career
After graduation Hall collaborated with his classmates, Marvin R. Weinstein and Jack C. Couffer, to create Canyon Films in 1949. In the beginning they made advertising commercials and documentaries and did pickup shots for features. In 1956 Canyon Films acquired a short film, My Brother Down There, which allowed Hall to enter into the cameraman position and become part of the International Photographers Guild. However, the Guild made Canyon Films hire an established Guild Cameraman for My Brother Down There, denying Hall credit, even though he shot the entire film. Instead he was credited as the visual consultant, after United Artists released the film under the new title Running Target.

Once Running Target was finished Canyon Films dissolved, and its members went off on their own paths.  Since Hall was part of the Guild, he was able to work as an assistant cameraman at the side of many influential cinematographers such as Hall Mohr, Ernie Haller, Burnie Guffey and Ted McCord, who were all part of the ASC. Following a year of working as an assistant cameraman, he was awarded the chance to be the camera operator on the television series Stoney Burke. In 1963, he began filming another television series called The Outer Limits. Then, in 1964, he shot his first feature-length black and white film, Wild Seed, which was made in roughly 24 days with producer Albert S. Ruddy.

Hall's breakthrough came with Morituri in 1965, for which he received his first Oscar nomination.  In the following year Hall shot Incubus, The Professionals, and Harper, which was his first color film. His first collaboration with director Richard Brooks on The Professionals was put in motion by assistant director Tom Shaw, who worked with Hall on Wild Seed and recommended him to Brooks; the work resulted in his second Oscar nomination.

Their second collaboration, 1967's In Cold Blood, resulted in yet another Oscar nomination. It is notable for the documentary feel and location shots, which were rare at the time. In that same year, Hall shot Cool Hand Luke and Divorce American Style. Cool Hand Luke is known for being shot in Panavision, which contributed to its lush color palette.  In 1968, Hall filmed Hell in the Pacific for director John Boorman, which was not a box-office success but has since become a cult classic.

In 1969, Hall received his first Oscar for Butch Cassidy and the Sundance Kid. To make Butch Cassidy visually compatible with the time period, he used experimental techniques, such as overexposing the negatives in order to mute the primary colors when printing it back (Hunter, 2003). The result was considered an innovative success. He made two other films that year, The Happy Ending and Tell them Willie Boy is Here. In 1972, Hall shot Fat City, with director John Huston. Fat City was known for its grainy texture to reflect the harsh reality of the storyline. In 1973 he shot the police thriller Electra Glide in Blue, followed by Smile and The Day of the Locust in 1975, the latter of which earned him his fifth Oscar nomination. In 1976 he shot Marathon Man with director John Schlesinger which was one of the first to use the Steadicam technique (although it was not the first to be released).

After shooting 18 films in 12 years, Hall took an 11-year break. Around the same time he teamed up with noted cinematographer Haskell Wexler to make a commercial production company (Vinson, 1987). This allowed him to not only be the cameraman on his own work, but also the director. The break for him was about understanding and learning from others about their unique techniques. As Hall stated: "At heart I am more than a cinematographer. I'm a filmmaker." This led to his exploration of writing, such as an adaptation of the novel The Wild Palms.

Hall returned to the film industry in 1987 to shoot Black Widow. In 1988 Hall became part of the union crew for Tequila Sunrise after a few complications. His work resulted in a sixth Oscar nomination. Also in 1988, the ASC gave Hall an outstanding achievement award. After his work on Tequila Sunrise, he picked up his old pace, making Class Action (1991), Jennifer 8 (1992), Searching for Bobby Fischer (1993) and Love Affair (1994) one after the other. Searching for Bobby Fischer received an Oscar nomination for cinematography, his seventh.

In 1994, Hall was honored with the lifetime achievement award from the American Society of Cinematographers. In 1998 he shot Without Limits and was Oscar nominated for A Civil Action, followed by his second win for American Beauty in 1999. American Beauty, his first collaboration with director Sam Mendes, highlighted his "unique use of the hand-held camera to capture the film's heightened reality and almost dream-like atmosphere". His final film was Road to Perdition in 2002, a second collaboration with Mendes, for which he was posthumously awarded another Academy Award. In total, he won three Oscars throughout his 50-year career.

Personal life
Hall married Virginia Schwartz in 1952. They had three children, Conrad W. Hall, Kate Hall-Feist and Naia Hall-West, before they divorced in 1969. Hall met actress Katharine Ross on the set of Butch Cassidy and the Sundance Kid and became her third of five husbands in 1969. Hall and Ross separated in 1973, finalizing their divorce in 1975 so that she could marry her fourth husband. His third marriage was to costume designer Susan Kowarsh-Hall, whom he worked with on Road to Perdition (2002), from an unknown date until his death.

Death
Hall died from bladder cancer at Santa Monica Hospital on January 4, 2003, at the age of 76. His Oscar for Road to Perdition (2002), which is dedicated to Hall, was posthumously accepted by his son Conrad W. Hall, also a cinematographer.

Hall was and still is affectionately referred to as "Connie" by his peers and associates.

Filmography

Film

Additional photography credits

Television

Awards and nominations

Academy Awards

British Academy Film Awards

American Society of Cinematographers

Other Awards

References

External links
 
 Interview with Conrad Hall
 Interview and retrospective at American Society of Cinematographers site

1926 births
2003 deaths
20th-century American male writers
20th-century American writers
20th Century Studios people
American male screenwriters
American cinematographers
Best Cinematographer Academy Award winners
Best Cinematography BAFTA Award winners
People from Papeete
USC School of Cinematic Arts alumni
Deaths from bladder cancer
Deaths from cancer in California
American people of French Polynesian descent
20th-century American screenwriters